The fifth season of House, also known as House, M.D., premiered September 16, 2008 and ended May 11, 2009. It began to air in a new time slot from September to December: Tuesday 8:00 pm. Starting January 19, 2009, House moved to Mondays at 8:00 pm.

Cast and characters

Main cast
 Hugh Laurie as Dr. Gregory House
 Lisa Edelstein as Dr. Lisa Cuddy
 Omar Epps as Dr. Eric Foreman
 Robert Sean Leonard as Dr. James Wilson
 Jennifer Morrison as Dr. Allison Cameron
 Jesse Spencer as Dr. Robert Chase
 Peter Jacobson as Dr. Chris Taub
 Olivia Wilde as Dr. Remy 'Thirteen' Hadley
 Kal Penn as Dr. Lawrence Kutner

Recurring cast
 Anne Dudek as Dr. Amber Volakis
 Jennifer Crystal Foley as Rachel Taub
 Michael Weston as Lucas Douglas
 Lori Petty as Janice Burke
 Diane Baker as Blythe House
 R. Lee Ermey as John House
 Tracy Vilar as Nurse Regina

Guest cast
Becky Baeling, Ed Brigadier, Darcy Rose Byrnes, Colleen Camp, Julia Campbell, Michael Leydon Campbell, B. K. Cannon, Clare Carey, Marcus Chait, Faune A. Chambers, Jake Cherry, Tim Colon, Jack Conley, Felicia Day, Mos Def, Mary Jo Deschanel, Marika Dominczyk, Taylor Dooley, Treshelle Edmond, Susan Egan, Sherilyn Fenn, Erika Flores, John Forest, Nathan Gamble, Angela Gots, Judy Greer, Brad Grunberg, Wood Harris, Christine Healy, Martin Henderson, Ashton Holmes, Željko Ivanek, Evan Jones, Elaine Kagan, Eric Kaldor, John Kapelos, Jay Karnes, Dominic Scott Kay, Sarah Knowlton, Alix Korey, Joanna Koulis, Ryan Lane, Meat Loaf, Todd Louiso, Alexandra Lydon, Phyllis Lyons, Meaghan Martin, Lindsey McKeon, Breckin Meyer, Devon Michaels, Christopher Moynihan, Becky O'Donohue, Scott Paulin, Evan Peters, Drew Powell, Nick Puga, David Purdham, Samantha Quan, Ben Reed, Carl Reiner, Emily Rios, Tim Rock, Jamie Rose, Alex Schemmer, Judith Scott, Samantha Shelton, Kyle Red Silverstein, Jimmi Simpson, Alex Sol, Maria Thayer, Jake Thomas, Sarah Thompson, Lucas Till, Jamie Tisdale, Bitsie Tulloch, Natasha Gregson Wagner, Christine Woods, Salvator Xuereb, Liza Colón-Zayas and Vanessa Zima.

Reception
Reception for season 5 met with generally positive reviews, and holds a Metacritic score of 77 out of 100, based on ten reviews, indicating "generally favorable reviews". It also holds a 100% approval rating on aggregate review website Rotten Tomatoes, with an average score of 8.1 based on nine collected reviews. Criticism on Season 5 includes A.A. Gill of the Sunday Times felt that the show had "lost its sense of humour". Maureen Ryan of the Chicago Tribune wrote, "House used to be one of the best shows on TV, but it's gone seriously off the rails".

Episodes

Home media

References
General
 
 

Specific

Further reading

External links

 
 House recaps at televisionwithoutpity.com
 House episodes information at film.com
 List of House episodes at TVGuide.com
 

 
2008 American television seasons
2009 American television seasons
Suicide in television